There is considerable dialectal variation in Turkish.

Turkish is a southern Oghuz language belonging to the Turkic languages. Turkish is natively and historically spoken by the Turkish people in Turkey, Cyprus, Bulgaria, Greece (primarily in Western Thrace), Kosovo, Meskhetia, North Macedonia, Romania, Iraq, Syria and other areas of traditional settlement which formerly, in whole or part, belonged to the Ottoman Empire. Turkish is the official language of Turkey, the de facto country of North Cyprus and is one of the official languages of Cyprus. It also has official (but not primary) status in the Prizren District of Kosovo and several municipalities of North Macedonia, depending on the concentration of Turkish-speaking local population. Modern standard Turkish is based on the dialect of Istanbul. Nonetheless, dialectal variation persists, in spite of the levelling influence of the standard used in mass media and the Turkish education system since the 1930s. The terms ağız or şive are often used to refer to the different types of Turkish dialects (such as Cypriot Turkish).

Balkan Turkish dialects

The Turkish language was introduced to the Balkans by the Ottoman Turks during the rule of the Ottoman Empire. Today, Turkish is still spoken by the Turkish minorities who are still living in the region, especially in Bulgaria, Greece (mainly in Western Thrace), Serbia, North Macedonia, and Romania. Balkans Ottoman Turkish dialects were first described at the beginning of the 20th century, and are called Rumelian—a term introduced by Gyula Németh in 1956. Németh also established the basic division between Eastern Rumelian and Western Rumelian group of dialects. The bundle of isoglosses separating the two groups roughly follows the Bulgarian yat border. The eight basic Western Rumelian Turkish features are:
 /ı/, /u/, /ü/ > /i/ word-finally
 the suffix -miş used for forming perfect (indefinite pass) tense is not subject to vowel harmony, i.e. it is invariant
 /i/ > /ı/ in noninitial and closed final syllables
 /ö/ > /oa/, /o/ and /ü/ > /ua/, /u/ in many words
 generalization of one of two possible forms in suffixes with low vowel harmony
 /ö/ > /ü/ in about 40 words, usually in a syllable-initial position
 retention of Ottoman Turkish /ğ/ as /g/
 the progressive past participle ending is not -yor but -y
Additional features have been suggested such as the fronting of /k/ and /g/ to palatal affricates or stops, and the loss of /h/, especially in a word-initial position.

Rumelian Turkish dialects are the source of Turkish loanwords in Balkan languages, not the modern standard Turkish language which is based on the Istanbul dialect. For example, Serbo-Croatian kàpija/капија "large gate" comes from Rumelian kapi, not standard Turkish kapı. The Rumelian Turkish dialect is spoken in East Thrace the European side of Turkey, in the provinces of Edirne, Kırklareli and Tekirdağ.

Cypriot Turkish dialect

The Turkish language was introduced to Cyprus with the Ottoman conquest in 1571 and became the politically dominant, prestigious language of the administration. In the post-Ottoman period, Cypriot Turkish was relatively isolated from standard Turkish and had strong influences from the Cypriot Greek dialect. The condition of exposure to Greek Cypriots led to a certain bilingualism whereby Turkish Cypriots' knowledge of Greek was important in areas where the two communities lived in mixed areas. The linguistic situation changed radically in 1974, when the island was divided into a Greek south and a Turkish north (Northern Cyprus). Today, the Cypriot Turkish dialect is being exposed to increasing standard Turkish through immigration from Turkey, new mass media, and new educational institutions.

Karamanli Turkish

Karamanli Turkish is a dialect spoken by the Karamanlide people who were a natively Turkish-speaking, Greek Orthodox community living in Central Anatolia prior to the population exchange and their deportation. It is verbally the same as the typical Central Anatolian dialect of Turkish but is written with the Greek alphabet.

Meskhetian Turkish dialect

The Meskhetian Turks speak an Eastern Anatolian dialect of Turkish, which hails from the regions of Kars, Ardahan, Iğdır and Artvin. The Meskhetian Turkish dialect has also borrowed from other languages (including Azerbaijani, Georgian, Kazakh, Kyrgyz, Russian, and Uzbek) which the Meskhetian Turks have been in contact with during the Russian and Soviet rule.

Syrian Turkmen dialect

Syrian Turkmens are a result of series of migrations throughout the history to the region either from Anatolia and the neighboring regions to the east or directly from Central Asia. The number of Turkmens in Syria is estimated to be up to a million, living mostly in the Turkmen Mountain region and north of Aleppo, but also in Homs and Quneitra Governorate. Under the rule of the Ba'ath party in Syria, the Turkmens suffered under a heavy assimilation policy and were forbidden to write or publish in Turkish. Due to the large area that Syrian Turkmen live, the dialects of these people vary according to the place they live. The Turkmens of the region surrounding Aleppo mostly speak a dialect similar to the Gaziantep and Kilis dialects of Turkish, while those living in the Turkmen Mountain region speak a dialect similar to the Turkish population of Hatay.

Romani Turkish dialect

The Romani people in Turkey speak their own Turkish dialect with some Romani words.

Danube Turkish dialect

The Danube Turkish dialect was once spoken by Turks inhabiting Ada Kaleh. It was based on Ottoman Turkish with Hungarian, Serbian, Romanian, and German words.

Turkish within the diaspora

Due to a large Turkish diaspora, significant Turkish-speaking communities also reside in countries such as Australia, Austria, Azerbaijan, Belgium, Canada, Denmark, El Salvador, Finland, France, Germany, Israel, Kazakhstan, Kyrgyzstan, the Netherlands, Russia, Sweden, Switzerland, Ukraine, the United Arab Emirates, the United Kingdom, and the United States. However, because of cultural assimilation of Turkish immigrants and their descendants in host countries, not all ethnic Turks speak the Turkish language with native fluency.

Anatolian dialects 

There are three major Anatolian Turkish dialect groups spoken in Turkey: the West Anatolian dialect (roughly to the west of the Euphrates), the East Anatolian dialect (to the east of the Euphrates), and the North East Anatolian group, which comprises the dialects of the Eastern Black Sea coast, such as Trabzon, Rize, and the littoral districts of Artvin.

The classification of the Anatolian dialects of the Turkish language:

1. Eastern Anatolian Dialects 
1.1.1. Ağrı, Malazgirt 
1.1.2. Muş, Bitlis 
1.1.3. Ahlat, Adilcevaz, Bulanık, Van 
1.1.4. Diyarbakır 
1.1.5. Palu, Karakoçan, Bingöl, Karlıova, Siirt
1.2.1. Kars (Yerli)
1.2.2. Erzurum, Aşkale, Ovacık, Narman 
1.2.3. Pasinler, Horasan, Hınıs, Tekman, Karayazı, Tercan (partim)
1.2.4. Bayburt, İspir (excl. northern), Erzincan, Çayırlı, Tercan (partim)
1.2.5. Gümüşhane 
1.2.6. Refahiye, Kemah 
1.2.7. Kars (Azeri and Terekeme)
1.3.1. Posof, Artvin, Şavşat, Ardanuç, Yusufeli 
1.3.2.1. Ardahan, Olur, Oltu, Şenkaya; Ahıska Turks (Georgia)
1.3.2.2. Tortum 
1.3.2.3. İspir (northern)
1.4.1. Kemaliye, İliç, Ağın 
1.4.2. Tunceli, Hozat, Mazgirt, Pertek 
1.4.3. Harput 
1.4.4. Elazığ, Keban, Baskil

2. Northeastern Anatolian Dialects 
2.1.1. Vakfıkebir, Akçaabat, Tonya, Maçka, Of, Çaykara 
2.1.2. Trabzon, Yomra, Sürmene, Araklı, Rize, Kalkandere, İkizdere
2.2.1. Çayeli
2.2.2. Çamlıhemşin, Pazar, Hemşin, Ardeşen, Fındıklı
2.3.1. Arhavi, Hopa (included Kemalpaşa belde)
2.3.2. Hopa (a little part)
2.3.3. Borçka, Muratlı, Camili, Meydancık, Ortaköy (Berta) bucak of Artvin (merkez)

3. Western Anatolian Dialects 
 (3.0) TRT Turkish (Istanbul) - considered as "standard".
3.1.1. Afyonkarahisar, Eskişehir, Uşak, Nallıhan 
3.1.2. Çanakkale, Balıkesir, Bursa, Bilecik 
3.1.3. Aydın, Burdur, Denizli, Isparta, İzmir, Kütahya, Manisa, Muğla 
3.1.4. Antalya
3.2. İzmit, Sakarya
3.3.1. Zonguldak, Devrek, Ereğli 
3.3.2. Bartın, Çaycuma, Amasra 
3.3.3. Bolu, Ovacık, Eskipazar, Karabük, Safranbolu, Ulus, Eflani, Kurucaşile 
3.3.4. Kastamonu
3.4.1. Göynük, Mudurnu, Kıbrıscık, Seben 
3.4.2. Kızılcahamam, Beypazarı, Çamlıdere, Güdül, Ayaş 
3.4.3. Çankırı, İskilip, Kargı, Bayat, Osmancık, Tosya, Boyabat
3.5.1. Sinop, Alaçam 
3.5.2. Samsun, Kavak, Çarşamba, Terme 
3.5.3. Ordu, Giresun, Şalpazarı
3.6.1. Ladik, Havza, Amasya, Tokat, Erbaa, Niksar, Turhal, Reşadiye, Almus 
3.6.2. Zile, Artova, Sivas, Yıldızeli, Hafik, Zara, Mesudiye 
3.6.3. Şebinkarahisar, Alucra, Suşehri 
3.6.4. Kangal, Divriği, Gürün, Malatya, Hekimhan, Arapkir
3.7.1. Akçadağ, Darende, Doğanşehir 
3.7.2. Afşin, Elbistan, Göksun, Andırın, Adana, Hatay, Tarsus, Ereğli 
3.7.3. Kahramanmaraş, Gaziantep 
3.7.4. Adıyaman, Halfeti, Birecik, Kilis
3.8. Ankara, Haymana, Balâ, Şereflikoçhisar, Çubuk, Kırıkkale, Keskin, Kalecik, Kızılırmak, Çorum, Yozgat, Kırşehir, Nevşehir, Niğde, Kayseri, Şarkışla, Gemerek
3.9. Konya, Mersin

References

Bibliography
 
 .
 .
 .
 .
 .
 
 

 
Languages of Turkey
Turkic languages